"You're Like Comin' Home" is a song recorded by American country music group Lonestar and it was released in June 2005 as the lead single from their sixth studio album Coming Home. The song peaked at number 8 on the U.S. Billboard Hot Country Songs chart. It was written by Brandon Kinney, Brian Dean Maher and Jeremy Stover.

Music video
The music video was directed by Trey Fanjoy and premiered in mid-2005.

Chart performance
"You're Like Comin' Home" debuted at number 51 on the U.S. Billboard Hot Country Songs chart for the week of June 18, 2005.

Year-end charts

Other versions
Canadian country music band Emerson Drive originally recorded this song, (under the title "You're Like Coming Home") on their 2004 album, What If? Their version was not released as a single, unlike Lonestar's version. A live recording of Emerson Drive's version was released as a digital single in 2005.

References

2005 singles
Emerson Drive songs
Lonestar songs
Music videos directed by Trey Fanjoy
BNA Records singles
Songs written by Jeremy Stover
2004 songs
Songs written by Brandon Kinney